The Dr. Laura Berman Show is an American reality-documentary television series on the Oprah Winfrey Network. The series debuted on June 6, 2011.

Premise
The series showcases the discussions between Dr. Laura Berman and her audience about everything ranging from intimacy to relationships and family.

Episodes

References

External links
 
 

2011 American television series debuts
2011 American television series endings
English-language television shows
Oprah Winfrey Network original programming